General Nathan A. Cooper (April 29, 1802 – July 25, 1879) was an American landowner, businessman, and military officer from Chester Township, New Jersey.

Biography
He was born on April 29, 1802, to Abraham Cooper (1762–1818) and Anna Wills (1774–1856) in Chester Township. He had a sister, Beulah Ann Cooper (1800–1885), who married Henry Seward.

When he was 16 years old his father died and he inherited the family land. It included farming lands, an iron mine (operated by Marsh, Craig & Evans) and a grist-mill. In 1826, his uncle, Nathan Cooper (1751–1834), built a new mill, now known as the Nathan Cooper Gristmill. Nathan A. inherited this mill when uncle Nathan died. By 1854, he was commissioned a Brigadier General of the state cavalry. In 1860, he built the General Nathan Cooper Mansion.

He married Mary Henrietta Leddell in 1843. He died on July 25, 1879 and is buried at the Pleasant Hill Cemetery in Chester.

Gallery

References

1802 births
1879 deaths
People from Chester Township, New Jersey
American militia generals
Military personnel from New Jersey